Jophery Clifford Brown (January 22, 1945 – January 11, 2014), was a pitcher in Major League Baseball who played for the Chicago Cubs, as well as an award-winning stunt man and actor.

Baseball career
Brown, a Grambling State University product, was drafted three times by major league teams (including the Boston Red Sox and Pittsburgh Pirates) before finally signing with the Cubs on June 20, 1966. He made his only major league appearance on September 21, 1968, against Pittsburgh at Forbes Field. Brown relieved Bobby Tiefenauer, who had in turn relieved the Cubs' starter that day, Joe Niekro. He allowed one run in two innings of work, memorably retiring opposing pitcher Dock Ellis on a line drive back to the mound for the final out of his debut. Brown was removed for pinch-hitter Clarence Jones in the next inning. He would never pitch in the majors again.

Acting career
Brown's first television role was uncredited as a police officer on a 1964 episode of Arrest and Trial, titled "The Black Flower." He first worked as a stunt man the next year on episodes of I Spy. Brown also played an uncredited role as a reporter on a 1965 I Spy episode, "So Long, Patrick Henry."

His next work in Hollywood didn't come until 1973 in Coffy, when Brown played uncredited roles as both a party guest and a stunt man. That began a 35-year career during which he acted in 35 films and did stunts in 115. Brown worked in as many as seven movies in a year.

Recognition came in the form of a World Stunt Award for Best Work with a Vehicle. He shared the award with nine others for a car-chase scene in Bad Boys II. Brown also was nominated with six others for a Screen Actors Guild Award for Outstanding Performance by a Stunt Ensemble in a Motion Picture in "Wanted". That 2008 film was the last in which he worked.

Other career highlights included working as a stunt double for Morgan Freeman in three films: Along Came a Spider (2001), The Sum of All Fears (2002) and Dreamcatcher (2003). Brown was the stunt coordinator on seven motion pictures: The Bingo Long Traveling All-Stars & Motor Kings (1975), Scarface (1983), Action Jackson and Miracle at Beekman's Place (1988), Graffiti Bridge (1990), House Party 3 (1994), Sudden Death (1995), Sometimes They Come Back... Again (1996) and The Relic (1997). He also played the gatekeeper in Jurassic Park.

His baseball background was helpful for Bingo Long, in which he worked both as stunt coordinator and in the role of All-Stars third baseman Emory "Champ" Chambers.

Brown's last acting role was an uncredited part as a chef in Spider-Man (2002).

Death 
Jophery Brown died on January 11, 2014, at the age of 68 just 11 days short of his 69th birthday from complications related to a cancer treatment.

Filmography

References

External links

SABR Biography Project

1945 births
2014 deaths
African-American baseball players
Baseball players from Louisiana
Chicago Cubs players
Grambling State Tigers baseball players
Sportspeople from Grambling, Louisiana
Major League Baseball pitchers
20th-century African-American sportspeople
21st-century African-American people